Patty Chang (born February 3, 1972 in San Leandro, California) is an American performance artist and film director living and working in Los Angeles, California. Originally trained as a painter, Chang received her Bachelor of Arts at the University of California, San Diego. It wasn't until she moved to New York that she became involved with the performance art scene.

She has staged solo shows in major cities, including Patty Chang at Jack Tilton Gallery, New York (1999),  Ven conmigo, nada contigo. Fuente. Melones. Afeitada. at Museo National de Reina Sofia, Madrid, Spain (2000), Patty Chang: Shangri-La at the Hammer Museum, Los Angeles, Museum of Contemporary Art, Chicago, and the New Museum, New York (2005), Flotsam Jetsam with longtime collaborator David Kelley at the Museum of Modern Art, New York (2014), and her most extensive exhibition to date, Patty Chang: The Wandering Lake, 2009-2017, at the Queens Museum, Queens, NY (2017–18). Her show The Wandering Lake will also show in Los Angeles. Currently, Chang is showing at the Museum of Fine Arts in Boston where she is a part of Read My Lips that will be up until May 2020.

Education, teaching, and awards 

Chang received a Bachelor of Arts at the University of California, San Diego in 1994, and studied abroad at L’Accademia Di Belle Arti in Venice, Italy, in 1993. She has held teaching positions at the Skowhegan School of Painting and Sculpture in Skowhegan, Maine, and her work has been recognized by many cultural organizations, including a 2003 Rockefeller Foundation Award. She was a 2008 finalist for the Hugo Boss Prize and a Guna S. Mundheim Fellow in the Visual Arts at the American Academy in Berlin in Germany for fall 2008. In 2012, she received the Creative Capital Award in Visual Arts,  and in 2014, she was a John Simon Guggenheim Memorial Foundation Guggenheim Fellow in Creative Arts—Fine Arts.

Work 
Her performative works deal with themes of gender, language and empathy, and she was described as "one of our most consistently exciting young artists" by The New York Times in 2005. Originally trained as a painter, she is primarily known for her short films, videos and performance art. Chang has participated in film as body dubbing which allows studios to remake films with more international casts. She often plays a central role in her own work, often seen as testing the acceptable boundaries of taste and endurance. Some of her work contains scatological elements, while others critique perceptions of female sexual roles. She often denounces the problems that she observes in contemporary society by staging her own body in intensely difficult situations, documenting her actions through video and photography. She began to take a more "behind the scenes" role and became "perhaps the least visible she has ever been in her own work” in her 2005 exhibition Shangri-La based on a fictional location in the 1933 novel Lost Horizon by James Hilton. Her recent work, especially "Invocation for The Wandering Lake" (2015–16), draws connections between landscape and the body. Many aspects of Chang's work connect back to her Asian culture such as her interest in Shangri-La as well as her criticism of Asian female stereotypes in her work Contortion (2000).

Filmography

References

External links
 Official website
 Work in the Guggenheim collection
 UCLA exhibition
 2002 freewaves festival report

1972 births
Living people
American people of Chinese descent
Educators from California
American women educators
Artists from San Francisco
Film directors from San Francisco
21st-century American women